Sayyid Suhrāb Walī was a legendary pīr (Sūfī master) associated with the central Asian region of Badakhshān. Little is known for certain of his life, or even if he really existed, but his importance as a legendary figure, prominent in mostly nineteenth-century central Asian Ismaili hagiography, is not doubted.

Account of Silk-i guhar-rīz
The earliest and most important hagiography of Sayyid Suhrāb is the Silk-i guhar-rīz, composed by Khwājah Aḥrār, who claimed descent from Sayyid Suhrāb, around 1251 AH/1835 CE in Jurm, a town in what is now the Afghan province of Badakhshān. This hagiography portrays Sayyid Suhrāb as a descendant of the Prophet Muḥammad and of Mūsā al-Kāẓim. It claims that Sayyid Suhrāb’s father was one Mīr Sayyid Ḥasan. Mīr learns of the renowned Nāṣir-i Khusraw and engages a prominent dervish, Bābā Ḥaydar, to escort the four-year-old Sayyid Suhrāb, then four years old, to Nāṣir. Sayyid Suhrāb studies alongside Umar Yumgī, but it is Sayyid Suhrāb whom Nāṣir then makes his principle disciple and successor (in a move more likely reflecting the spiritual politics of the Ismaili community that produced the text than any historical reality), and the charismatic Sayyid Suhrāb goes on to have a large following of his own. Many central Asian Ismaili families continue to claim Sayyid Suhrāb as an ancestor and a source of their own spiritual authority. Another prominent hagiography of Sayyid Suhrāb is entitled Baḥr al-akhbār.

Historicity 
In the assessment of Daniel Beben, 'the extent of Sayyid Suhrāb’s presence within the genealogical traditions of the Badakhshān region suggests that his name bears at least some connection to a historical figure'. He argues that notwithstanding the traditional association with Nāṣir-i Khusraw (implying a twelfth-century date for Sayyid Suhrāb), the genealogies actually imply a date of birth around 1400 CE. Since the Ismaili text Ṣaḥīfat al-nāẓirīn is in the majority of known manuscripts attributed to Sayyid Suhrāb but in another recension attributed to the fifteenth-century Ghiyāth al-Dīn ʿAlī Iṣfahānī, Beben has even suggested that Sayyid Suhrāb might in origin have been Ghiyāth al-Dīn himself.

References

External links
 Sayyid Suhrāb Valī in the Princeton Badakhshan Genealogical Document Collection
 'BADAḴŠĀNI, Sayyed SOHRĀB WALI', Encyclopaedia Iranica

Ismailism in Afghanistan
Ismaili literature